Michael Ely is the writer of the trilogy of books surrounding the events in the computer game Sid Meier's Alpha Centauri.

Works
 Centauri Dawn - 
 Dragon Sun - 
 Twilight of the Mind -

See also
List of novels based on video games

References

External links

Science fiction writers
Living people
Year of birth missing (living people)
Place of birth missing (living people)